Anticoryne ovalifolia is a common heathland shrub found in coastal areas of Western Australia.

It is often found on rocky slopes growing in sandy soils among quartzite or granite in a small area along the south coast of Western Australia.

The species was first formally described in 1860 by Ferdinand von Mueller who gave it the name Harmogia ovalifolia  in his Fragmenta Phytographiae Australiae.<ref name="F.Muell.">{{cite book |last1=von Mueller |first1=Ferdinand |title=Fragmenta Phytographiae Australiae |volume=2 |date=1860 |publisher=Victorian Government Printer |location=Melbourne |page=32 |url=https://www.biodiversitylibrary.org/item/7219#page/35/mode/1up |access-date=7 January 2022}}</ref> In 1864, von Mueller changed the name to the Baeckea ovalifolia and in 2012, Barbara Lynette Rye changed the name to Anticoryne ovalifolia in the journal Nuytsia''.

References

Flora of Western Australia
ovalifolia
Plants described in 1860
Taxa named by Ferdinand von Mueller